This is a List of rugby union clubs in Germany. It lists all rugby union clubs in Germany registered with the German Rugby Federation, the DRV, or taking part in the German league system. As of April 2010, the International Rugby Board lists the number of clubs in Germany at 110.

Some of the clubs competing in the German league system are clubs of the US and British armed forces in Germany and therefore not necessarily members of the DRV. Examples of US Army rugby clubs in Germany are the teams in Illesheim, Ramstein and Vilseck, while other clubs, like in the RC Kaiserslautern, recruit some of their players from the US forces but have German players as well.<ref>Americans set to compete for German rugby clubs Stars and Stripes, published: 7 September 2006, accessed: 16 April 2010</ref> Up to 32 US forces teams had been playing in Southern Germany at its peak, based in Hesse, Rhineland-Palatinate, Bavaria and Baden-Württemberg, being organised in the "United States Forces Europe Rugby Union" (USFERU). Most disappeared with the withdrawal of US forces from Germany at the end of the Cold War. A number of clubs remained but have since dropped out of the German league system, like the Bamberg RFC, Darmstadt 233rd BSB RFC, Hanau Hornets, Schweinfurt RFC, Spangdahlem RFC and Würzburg RFC, while a few, like the Ramstein Rogues RFC, Illesheim RFC and Baumholder RFC still compete in 2009–10.

The RC Mönchengladbach Rhinos and the Elmpt Falcons are rugby teams of the British Army in Germany and still active.BFG INSTALLATION ACCESS PASS FOR VETERANS DETAILS OF FACILITIES FOR JHQ/ELMPT/WILDENRATH British Army Rugby Union website, accessed: 17 April 2010

The oldest rugby union club in Germany is the DSV 78 Hannover, formed in 1878 as DFV Hannover, in a time when a differencation between rugby and football was not yet made in Germany. While there is older clubs in Germany then DSV 78, like the Heidelberger TV which was formed in 1846, their rugby departments were established after DSV's.

Clubs by state
The German rugby clubs, listed by federal state, with the league their first men's and women's teams play in 2009–10, in as far as the clubs field a senior side at all:

Baden-Württemberg
Rugby clubs in the state of Baden-Württemberg:Die Vereine im DRV – PLZ 7  DRV website – List of clubs – Post code 7, accessed: 16 April 2010< 3. Liga Süd-West  , accessed: 1 April 2016

(* pending updates)

Bavaria
Rugby clubs in the state of Bavaria:Die Vereine im DRV – PLZ 9  DRV website – List of clubs – Post code 9, accessed: 16 April 2010

Berlin
Rugby clubs in the state of Berlin:

Brandenburg
Rugby clubs in the state of Brandenburg:

Bremen
Rugby clubs in the Free Hanseatic City of Bremen:

Hamburg
Rugby clubs in the state of Hamburg:

Hesse
Rugby clubs in the state of Hesse:Die Vereine im DRV – PLZ 3  DRV website – List of clubs – Post code 3, accessed: 16 April 2010

Lower Saxony
Rugby clubs in the state of Lower Saxony:

Mecklenburg-Vorpommern
Rugby clubs in the state of Mecklenburg-Vorpommern:

North Rhine-Westphalia
Rugby clubs in the state of North Rhine-Westphalia:Die Vereine im DRV – PLZ 4  DRV website – List of clubs – Post code 4, accessed: 16 April 2010

Rhineland-Palatinate
Rugby clubs in the state of Rhineland-Palatinate:

Saarland
Rugby clubs in the state of Saarland:

Saxony
Rugby clubs in the state of Saxony:

Saxony-Anhalt
Rugby clubs in the state of Saxony-Anhalt:

Schleswig-Holstein
Rugby clubs in the state of Schleswig-Holstein:

Thuringia
Rugby clubs in the state of Thuringia:

Foreign clubs
In the 2009–10 season, two clubs from outside the borders of Germany take part in German league competitions, one from Luxembourg and one from Austria:

Defunct clubs & teams

Germany

The following clubs have ceased to exist or stopped operating a rugby department:

East Germany
The following clubs existed in the former country of East Germany. Some of them have ceased to exist or to operate a rugby department while others have changed their name:

Key

Men:
BL – Rugby-Bundesliga
2BLN/E – 2nd Rugby-Bundesliga North/East
2BLS/W – 2nd Rugby-Bundesliga South/West
RLBW – Regionalliga Baden-Württemberg 
RLB – Regionalliga Bavaria 
RLEA – Regionalliga East – Division A 
RLEB – Regionalliga East – Division B 
RLH – Regionalliga Hesse 
RLLS – Regionalliga Lower Saxony 
RLN – Regionalliga North 
RLNW – Regionalliga North Rhine-Westphalia 
RLRP – Regionalliga Rhineland-Palatinate 
VLB – Verbandsliga Bavaria 
VLBW – Verbandsliga Baden-Württemberg 
VLN – Verbandsliga North 
VLNW – Verbandsliga North Rhine-Westphalia 
E7 – East 7s league 

Women:
WBL – Women's Rugby Bundesliga 
W2BL – Women's 2nd Rugby Bundesliga 
WRLE – Women's Regionalliga East 
WRLN – Women's Regionalliga North 
WRLS – Women's Regionalliga South 
WRLW – Women's Regionalliga West

Notes
A.  Playing as 08 Ricklingen/Wunstorf, a partnership of SV 08 Ricklingen and TuS Wunstorf.
B.  Playing as SG SV Odin/VfR Döhren, a partnership of SV Odin Hannover and VfR Döhren.
C.  Playing as SG Jesteburg/Geesthacht, a partnership of VfL Jesteburg and VfL Geesthacht Harlekins.
D.  Playing as SG 80 III/Babenhausen, a partnership of the third team of SC 1880 Frankfurt and CRC Babenhausen.
E.  The East 7s league, or Mitteldeutsche Siebener Liga, is a development league for emerging rugby clubs in what was formerly East Germany.

References

External links
  German Rugby Federation website
  German rugby results & tables Rugby-Journal'' website
  Rugbyweb.de – Result archive

Germany
Rugby union